"Holding On for You" is a song by English-Irish pop group Liberty X. Written by Martin Prime and produced by Tim Laws, it released in the United Kingdom on 2 December 2002 as the fifth and final single from the group's debut studio album, Thinking It Over (2002). The single peaked at number five on the UK Singles Chart, becoming the joint third highest-charting single from the LP. It was the band's first ballad to be released as a single, and despite low airplay, the song was a minor hit across Europe, being successful in Ireland, the Netherlands, and Switzerland.

Background
The "Single Remix" version of "Holding On for You", known in the United Kingdom, was also issued internationally, under the pseudonym of the "B&Q Mix". The original version of the track appears on To Those Who Wait in 2001, the band's debut release, exclusively in Japan. The version of the track which features on the British version of the album is slightly different to all of the other versions, and for international releases, this was dubbed the alternative version. An alternative version also appears a bonus track on the band's third studio album, X. One of the single's B-sides, "So Alive", was never issued on CD in the United Kingdom.

Music video
The music video for the track was filmed in September 2002, and features each of the five members of the band making their way to the Budapest Metro, from their respective locations. Scenes at the end of the video depict the band leaving the station on separate trains, as to represent the individuality of each of the band members. The video features on the band's live DVD, Just a Little: Live at Cardiff Arena, as well as the bonus DVD that accompanied the Australian edition of the band's third studio album, X.

Track listings
UK CD single 1
 "Holding On for You" (Single Remix) – 3:25
 "Shut Up and Dance" – 3:15
 "Before It's Goodbye" – 3:14

UK CD single 2
 "Holding On for You" (Double R Remix) – 5:08
 "Holding On for You" (Brooks' Hold Tight Mix) – 6:05
 "Holding On for You" (Mickey P & Ralph Alternative Mix) – 3:42
 "Holding On for You" (Double R Instrumental) – 5:08

UK Cassette single
 "Holding On for You" (Single Remix) – 3:25
 "So Alive" – 3:38

German CD single
 "Holding On for You" (B&Q Mix) – 3:18
 "Shut Up and Dance" – 3:15
 "Before It's Goodbye" – 3:14
 "So Alive" – 3:38
 "Holding On for You" (Double R Remix) – 5:08

Charts

Weekly charts

Year-end charts

Release history

References

2002 singles
2002 songs
2000s ballads
Films shot in Budapest
Films set in Budapest
Liberty X songs
V2 Records singles
UK Independent Singles Chart number-one singles